Sascha Faxe (born 4 August 1971) is a Danish politician who has served as Member of the Folketing for The Alternative since the 2022 election.

Career 
Despite standing and receiving 1,192 votes in the 2019 election, Faxe was not elected and rather served as primary substitute in the Zealand constituency. She announced her candidacy for leadership of The Alternative after Uffe Elbæk stepped down, but was beaten out by Josephine Fock.

Faxe, who hails from Lolland, but lives in Roskilde, was elected to the Folketing in 2022 with 1,129 personal votes. She has stated a desire to bring the green policies of Roskilde to all of Denmark through her new position.

Personal life 
Faxe has two children, born in 2003 and 2001 respectively.

References 

1971 births
The Alternative (Denmark) politicians
Living people
Members of the Folketing 2022–2026
21st-century Danish women politicians
Women members of the Folketing